Jordan Jansen (born 12 March 1998) is an Australian pop singer from Gold Coast, Queensland.

In May 2010, Hollywoodlife.com called Jansen "the latest pride and joy of Australia", following his appearances on Australia's Got Talent and sudden rise to popularity online.

Jansen has been called "the new Bieber" and has more than three-quarters of a million followers on Twitter and a fan club of devotees who call themselves "Jordaneers".

As of March 2018, his music video of the Leonard Cohen song "Hallelujah" has over 4.9 million views on YouTube. As of March 2018, his YouTube channel as a whole has accumulated over 37 million views.

In 2011, Jansen was signed by American record label Kite Records (Toby Gad) and Australian label Sony Music Australia, with David Sonenberg as his manager. In late 2014, they parted ways and Jansen announced his upcoming EP to be released in the fall of 2015.

On 31 May 2016, his EP Invincible was released worldwide.

References

External links

 
 

1998 births
Living people
Australian child singers
Australian dance musicians
Australian guitarists
Australian Internet celebrities
Australian pianists
Australian pop singers
Child pop musicians
Male pianists
21st-century Australian singers
21st-century pianists
21st-century guitarists
21st-century Australian male singers
Australian male guitarists